Andres Mandre (born 20 March 1944 in Paide) is an Estonian economist and politician. He was a member of VIII Riigikogu.

References

Living people
1944 births
20th-century Estonian economists
Social Democratic Party (Estonia) politicians
Members of the Riigikogu, 1995–1999
Tallinn University of Technology alumni
People from Paide
21st-century Estonian economists